Alexis Apostolopoulos (born 7 November 1991) is a Greek professional footballer who plays as a right-back for Super League 2 club PAOK B.

Career
Alexis Apostolopoulos made his debut in Football League 2 with Zakynthos in September 2010.

Child of the infrastructure division of PAOK Alexis Apostolopoulos football grew in Toumpa, where he made his first football steps rising from all parts of the Academies.
Transferred on loan from PAOK 2011–12. Initially the group of Zakynthos and then in Anagennisi Giannitsa to return to the team in the summer of 2011, and under the guidance of László Bölöni to make his first appearances with the jersey of PAOK.

His debut came in Dublin on 3 November 2011 in the last minutes of the match Shamrock Rovers - PAOK 1-3 for groups of 2010–11 UEFA Europa League, while in the Super League, the first participation and even as a key came in an away win against Panathinaikos - PAOK 0-2 at the Athens Olympic Stadium in Athens, on 4 March 2012.

With the Greece national under-19 football team, he had six appearances, making his debut on 6 October 2009 against the Faroe Islands, and had appearances with the Greece national under-21 football team.

The 2013–2014 season for Apostolopoulos started with a long loan to Veria because he was not in Huub Stevens plans. On 24 July 2017, Apostolopoulos signed with PAS Giannina.

Club statistics

National statistics

Statistics accurate as of 20 July 2013

Honours 
PAS Giannina

 Super League Greece 2: 2019–20

References

Living people
1991 births
Greek footballers
Greece youth international footballers
Greece under-21 international footballers
Super League Greece players
PAOK FC players
Veria F.C. players
Platanias F.C. players
PAS Giannina F.C. players
Association football fullbacks
People from Gargalianoi
Footballers from the Peloponnese
PAOK FC B players